Titteliture was the Sveriges Television's Christmas calendar and Sveriges Radio's Christmas Calendar in 1960. The radio version was called Barnens adventskalender ("The Children's Christmas Calendar").

Plot 
Every time, except for Wednesdays (that were TV-broadcasting-free in Sweden at that time), a "tomte" called Titteliture (a name created from tittut, the Swedish term for "peekaboo") opens a calendar window. Behind each calendar window is a guest, and adventure or a riddle.

References

External links 
 

Sveriges Radio's Christmas Calendar
1960 radio programme debuts
1960 radio programme endings
1960 Swedish television series debuts
1960 Swedish television series endings
Sveriges Television's Christmas calendar